The Citizen is a weekly newspaper serving Charlotte, Vermont and Hinesburg, Vermont. It is published every Thursday and has a circulation of 4,500. The current managing editor is Jessie Forand.

History 
The newspaper was established in 2006 as the Charlotte Citizen, but changed its name to The Citizen in 2011 to accommodate its expansion into neighboring Hinesburg, Vermont.

The paper was part of Wind Ridge Publishing, owned by Holly Johnson. In 2015, Wind Ridge Publishing, which owned The Citizen and Shelburne News, moved its printing operations to Vermont.

In 2017, the Citizen was purchased by the Stowe Reporter Group, under publisher Greg Popa. In January 2019, the Stowe Reporter Group was renamed Vermont Community Newspaper Group.

References

Weekly newspapers published in the United States
Newspapers published in Vermont
Charlotte, Vermont
Hinesburg, Vermont
Publications established in 2006
2006 establishments in Vermont